Banhadoa is a genus of moths belonging to the family Tortricidae.

Species
Banhadoa luculenta Razowski & Becker, 1983

See also
List of Tortricidae genera

References

 , 2005: World Catalogue of Insects volume 5 Tortricidae.
 , 1983, Acta zool. cracov. 26: 432
 , 2011: Diagnoses and remarks on genera of Tortricidae, 2: Cochylini (Lepidoptera: Tortricidae). Shilap Revista de Lepidopterologia 39 (156): 397–414.

External links
tortricidae.com

Cochylini
Tortricidae genera
Taxa named by Józef Razowski